N-Coded Music was a jazz record label in New York City founded by Dave Grusin, Larry Rosen, and Phil Ramone as N2K Encoded Music in 1997.

Their original business model was to break out new artists and groups from various genres (mainly smooth jazz) by releasing their music through its co-owned online music site, Music Boulevard, in the form of CDs and downloads using the Liquid Audio format. CDs were also distributed by RED Music for the traditional retail market. After Music Boulevard and its main competitor, CDNow merged, N2K Encoded Music was sold to Warlock Records and renamed N-Coded Music.

N-Coded's roster included Ann Hampton Callaway, Jane Monheit, Candy Dulfer, Andy Bey, and Jonathan Butler.

See also 
 List of record labels

References

External links
 Phase One Network

American record labels
Jazz record labels
Record labels established in 1997
Companies based in New York City